is a retired Japanese professional shogi player who achieved the rank of 8-dan.

Shogi professional
Tosa's only tournament victory as a shogi professional came in 1998 when he defeated Toshiyuki Moriuchi to win the 32nd .

In August 2010, Tosa defeated Kiyozumi Kiriyama in 69th Meijin Class B2 league play to become the 42nd professional to win 600 official games.

In March 2017, Tosa finished the finished 75th Meijin Class C2 league play (April 2016March 2017) with a record of no wins and 10 losses, earning a second demotion point which meant he was only one point away from automatic demotion to "Free Class" play. As a result, he declared his intention to the Japan Shogi Association to become a Free Class player as of April 2017 rather than risk automatic demotion.

On June 8, 2020, the Japan Shogi Association announced on its website that Tosa had retired from professional shogi. His official retirement date was given as May 14, 2020.

Promotion history
The promotion history for Tosa is as follows:
 1971: 6-kyū
 1973: 1-dan
 1976, February 19: 4-dan
 1984, April 1: 5-dan
 1989, April 14: 6-dan
 1997, July 25: 7-dan
 2014, September 18: 8-dan
 2020, May 14: Retired

Titles and other championships
Tosa has never appeared in a major title match, but he has won one non-title shogi championships during his career.

Awards and honors
Tosa received the JSA's "25 Years Service Award" in 2000 in recognition of being an active professional for twenty-five years and the "Shogi Honor Award" in 2010 for winning 600 official games.

References

External links
 ShogiHub: Tosa, Koji

Japanese shogi players
Living people
Professional shogi players
Professional shogi players from Niigata Prefecture
1955 births
Retired professional shogi players